Sin City is an American pornographic film studio. The company is owned by David Sturman, the son of Reuben Sturman. David Sturman's son Jared is the General Manager. In 2007 it signed a two-year exclusive contract with Tory Lane to perform in and direct films. In May 2008 it was announced that she had left her contract early.

Awards
1993 AVN Award – Best Packaging (Film) – Sin City – The Movie
1994 AVN Award – Best Packaging (Video) – Hungry
1996 AVN Award – Best Gang Bang Tape – 30 Men For Sandy
1999 AVN Award – Best Actor (Film) – Models (James Bonn)
1999 AVN Award – Best Supporting Actor (Film) – Models (Michael J. Cox)
2000 AVN Award – Best Actor (Film) – Chloe (James Bonn)
2000 AVN Award – Best Actress (Film) – Chloe (Chloe)
2001 AVN Award – Best Editing (Film) – Watchers (Michael Raven & Sammy Slater)
2001 AVN Award – Best Screenplay (Film) – Watchers (Michael Raven & George Kaplan)
2001 AVN Award – Best Supporting Actor (Film) – Watchers (Randy Spears)
2001 AVN Award – Best Actor (Film) – Adrenaline (Evan Stone)
2001 AVN Award – Best All-Sex Film – Erotica
2001 AVN Award – Best Film – Watchers
2002 AVN Award – Best Actor (Film) – Beast (Anthony Crane)
2003 AVN Award – Best Supporting Actor (Film) – Paradise Lost (Mr. Marcus)
2003 AVN Award – Best Overall Marketing Campaign (Individual Title or Series) – Paradise Lost
2003 NightMoves Award – Best Film/Video (Editor's Choice) – Riptide
2003 NightMoves Award – Best Film/Video Company
2006 AFW Award – Best Fetish Series – Dementia
2007 AFW Award – Most Outrageous Movie – Sodom 2
2007 AVN Award – Best Continuing Video Series – Dementia
2008 AFW Award – Most Outrageous Movie – The Hitchhiker

References

External links
 

American pornographic film studios
Companies based in Los Angeles County, California
Film production companies of the United States
Pornography in California
American companies established in 1987
American companies disestablished in 2013